The United States of America competed at the 2011 World Championships in Athletics from August 27 to September 4 in Daegu, South Korea.

Team selection

The team was led by reigning World Champions LaShawn Merritt
(400m), Kerron Clement (400m hurdles), Dwight Phillips (long jump),
Christian Cantwell (shot put), and Trey Hardee (decathlon) in the
men's team, and Allyson Felix (200m), Sanya Richards-Ross (400m), and
Brittney Reese (long jump) in the women's team.

In the final roster Debbie Dunn and Delilah DiCrescenzo withdrew due to injury and were replaced. 
Michael Rodgers withdrew after testing positive for the banned stimulant methylhexaneamine at a meeting in Italy in July.. Trell Kimmons replaced him in the 100m.
Jeremy Dodson was forced to withdraw after his passport was confiscated following his arrest on a charge of identity theft.

The final team on the entry list comprises the names of 155 athletes, including 2 athletes invited by the IPC for exhibition
events: Joshua George, 400m T53 (wheelchair) men, and Amberlynn Weber, 800m T54 (wheelchair) women.

After all, 127 athletes competed in the different events.

Medalists
The following competitors from the United States of America won medals at the Championships

| width="78%" align="left" valign="top" |

Results

Men

Decathlon

Women

Heptathlon

Reserves

According to the qualification standards
USA Track & Field nominated more athletes (having achieved the A qualification mark, "reserves") than allowed to compete in each specific event.

The following athletes appeared on the preliminary Entry List, but not on the Official Start List of the specific event, resulting in a total number of 127 competitors:

References

External links
Official local organising committee website
Official IAAF competition website

Nations at the 2011 World Championships in Athletics
World Championships in Athletics
2011